Matanibike is a settlement in Kiribati.  It is located on the island of Teraina.

References

Populated places in Kiribati